Erik Friberg (born 31 March 1983) is a professional poker player from Stockholm, Sweden

Friberg's first major success in poker came in the 2006 World Series of Poker Main Event, where he finished in 8th place earning $1,979,189. Since then, Friberg participated in the 2007 World Series of Poker, with his biggest finish there being a 3rd-place finish in the $5,000 No Limit Hold'em – Six Handed event, he won $345,582 for his finish.

As of 2009, his total live tournament winnings exceed $2,700,000. His three cashes at the WSOP account for $2,445,927 of those winnings. Friberg plays at Pokerstars under the name "lirarerik".

References

External links
Anti Poker Cheating

Swedish poker players
People from Stockholm
1983 births
Living people